The Leo P. Kadanoff Prize is awarded annually by the American Physical Society (APS) for outstanding research in statistical or nonlinear physics. The research can be theoretical, experimental, or computational.

The award was established by the APS Topical Group on Statistical and Nonlinear Physics in 2018 as a memorial tribute to Leo P. Kadanoff, a member (elected in 1978) of the National Academy of Sciences, a co-winner of the 1980 Wolf Prize in Physics, and the president of the APS in 2007–2008. The award consists of $10,000, a medal, a certificate, and limited travel expenses to the APS meeting where the award is conferred. The award was initially established with contributions from family, friends, and colleagues of Kadanoff and was later fully endowed by a large, anonymous gift.

Recipients

References

Awards established in 2018
Awards of the American Physical Society